Romano Albani (born 25 September 1945) was an Italian cinematographer and camera operator.

Career 
Albani started his career with commercials. His film credits include Marco Ferreri's  La Dernière femme (U.S. title: The Last Woman) (1976), Dario Argento's Inferno (1980) and Phenomena (1985),  Troll (1986), a remake of Roman Holiday (1987) and four of the movies in the Fantaghirò series.

References

External links

1945 births
Living people
Italian cinematographers
People from Livorno